The 1864–65 United States House of Representatives elections were held on various dates in various states between June 5, 1864 and November 7, 1865, in the midst of the American Civil War and President Abraham Lincoln's reelection. Each state set its own date for its elections to the House of Representatives. Members were elected before the first session of the 39th United States Congress convened on December 4, 1865, including the at-large seat from the new state of Nevada, and the 8 from Tennessee, the first secessionist state to be readmitted. The other 10 secessionist states had not yet been readmitted, and therefore were not seated.

The opposition Democrats were deeply divided between the Copperheads, a group that demanded an immediate negotiated settlement with the Confederate States of America, and the War Democrats, who supported the war. With the Democrats lacking any coherent message, they lost half their seats to Lincoln's Republican Party, who increased their majority to a commanding level.

The National Union Party (formerly known as the Unionists) lost seven seats, retaining control of 18 seats (some classify the Representatives as including 13 Unconditional Unionists and five Unionists), all from the border states of Maryland, Tennessee, and Kentucky, as well as West Virginia.

Election summaries 
One new seat was added for the new State of Nevada and 8 vacancies were filled by the readmission of Tennessee, the first secessionist state to be readmitted. Three former Confederate States held elections in 1865 that were rejected by Congress.

Of the rejected elections, Florida's and Mississippi's claimants' parties are unknown, while North Carolina elected 4 Union and 3 Conservative Representatives.

Special elections

38th Congress 

|-
! 
| Owen Lovejoy
| 
| 1856
|  | Incumbent died March 25, 1864.New member elected May 19, 1864.Republican hold.
| nowrap | 

|-
! 
| Henry G. Stebbins
| 
| 1862
|  | Incumbent resigned October 24, 1864.New member elected November 8, 1864.Democratic hold.
| nowrap | 

|}

39th Congress 

|-
! 
| Edwin H. Webster
|  | Unconditional Unionist
| 1859
|  | Incumbent resigned July 1865.New member elected November 7, 1865.Unconditional Unionist hold.
| nowrap | 

|-
! 
| Daniel W. Gooch
|  | National Union
| 1858 
|  | Incumbent resigned September 1, 1865.New member elected November 7, 1865.National Union hold.
| nowrap | 

|-
! 
| Orlando Kellogg
|  | National Union
| 1862
|  | Incumbent died August 24, 1865.New member elected November 7, 1865.National Union hold.
| nowrap | 

|}

Alabama

Arizona Territory 
See Non-voting delegates, below.

Arkansas

California 

Note: This was the first election in which California elected representatives from congressional districts.

|-
! 
| Cornelius Cole.
|  | Republican
| 1863
|  | Unknown if incumbent retired or lost renomination.New member elected.
| nowrap | 

|-
! 
| William Higby.
|  | Republican
| 1863
| Incumbent re-elected.
| nowrap | 

|-
! 
| Thomas B. Shannon.
|  | Republican
| 1863
|  | Incumbent retired.New member elected.Republican hold.
| nowrap | 

|}

Colorado Territory 
See non-voting delegates, below.

Connecticut

Dakota Territory 
See non-voting delegates, below.

Delaware

Florida

Georgia

Idaho Territory 
See non-voting delegates, below.

Illinois

Indiana

Iowa

Kansas

Kentucky

Louisiana

Maine

Maryland

Massachusetts 

|-
! 
| Thomas D. Eliot
|  | National Union
| 1858
| Incumbent re-elected.
| nowrap | 

|-
! 
| Oakes Ames
|  | National Union
| 1862
| Incumbent re-elected.
| nowrap | 

|-
! 
| Alexander H. Rice
|  | National Union
| 1858
| Incumbent re-elected.
| nowrap | 

|-
! 
| Samuel Hooper
|  | National Union
| 1861 (special)
| Incumbent re-elected.
| nowrap | 

|-
! 
| John B. Alley
|  | National Union
| 1858
| Incumbent re-elected.
| nowrap | 

|-
! 
| Daniel W. Gooch
|  | National Union
| 1858
| Incumbent re-elected.
| nowrap | 

|-
! 
| George S. Boutwell
|  | National Union
| 1862
| Incumbent re-elected.
| nowrap | 
|-
! 
| John D. Baldwin
|  | National Union
| 1862
| Incumbent re-elected.
| nowrap | 

|-
! 
| William B. Washburn
|  | National Union
| 1862
| Incumbent re-elected.
| nowrap | 

|-
! 
| Henry Laurens Dawes
|  | National Union
| 1856
| Incumbent re-elected.
| nowrap | 

|}

Michigan

Minnesota

Mississippi

Missouri

Montana Territory 
See non-voting delegates, below.

Nebraska Territory 
See non-voting delegates, below.

Nevada

38th Congress 

On October 31, 1864, the new state of Nevada elected Republican Henry G. Worthington to finish the term ending March 3, 1865.

|-
! 
| colspan=3 | New state
|  | New member elected.Republican gain.
| nowrap | 

|}

39th Congress 

Worthington was not renominated for the next term, however, and on November 7, 1865, Republican Delos R. Ashley was elected November 7, 1865 for the term that had already begun but would not formally meet until December 4, 1865.

|-
! 
| Henry G. Worthington
|  | Republican
| 1864 
|  | Incumbent lost renomination.New member elected.Republican hold.
| nowrap | 

|}

New Hampshire

New Jersey

New Mexico Territory 
See non-voting delegates, below.

New York

North Carolina

Ohio 

Ohio's delegation swung from 14–5 Democratic to 17-2 Republican as 10 Democratic incumbents lost renomination or re-election.

|-
! 
| George H. Pendleton
|  | Democratic
| 1856
|  | Incumbent retired to run for Vice President.New member elected.Republican gain.
| nowrap | 

|-
! 
| Alexander Long
|  | Democratic
| 1862
|  | Incumbent lost renomination.New member elected.Republican gain.
| nowrap | 

|-
! 
| Robert C. Schenck
|  | Republican
| 1862
| Incumbent re-elected.
| nowrap | 

|-
! 
| John F. McKinney
|  | Democratic
| 1862
|  | Incumbent lost re-election.New member elected.Republican gain.
| nowrap | 

|-
! 
| Francis C. Le Blond
|  | Democratic
| 1862
| Incumbent re-elected.
| nowrap | 

|-
! 
| Chilton A. White
|  | Democratic
| 1860
|  | Incumbent lost re-election.New member elected.Republican gain.
| nowrap | 

|-
! 
| Samuel S. Cox
|  | Democratic
| 1862
|  | Incumbent lost re-election.New member elected.Republican gain.
| nowrap | 

|-
! 
| William Johnston
|  | Democratic
| 1862
|  | Incumbent lost re-election.New member elected.Republican gain.
| nowrap | 

|-
! 
| Warren P. Noble
|  | Democratic
| 1860
|  | Incumbent lost re-election.New member elected.Republican gain.
| nowrap | 

|-
! 
| James M. Ashley
|  | Republican
| 1862
| Incumbent re-elected.
| nowrap | 

|-
! 
| Wells A. Hutchins
|  | Democratic
| 1862
|  | Incumbent lost re-election.New member elected.Republican gain.
| nowrap | 

|-
! 
| William E. Finck
|  | Democratic
| 1862
| Incumbent re-elected.
| nowrap | 

|-
! 
| John O'Neill
|  | Democratic
| 1862
|  | Incumbent retired.New member elected.Republican gain.
| nowrap | 

|-
! 
| George Bliss
|  | Democratic
| 1862
|  | Incumbent lost re-election.New member elected.Republican gain.
| nowrap | 

|-
! 
| James R. Morris
|  | Democratic
| 1862
|  | Incumbent lost re-election.New member elected.Republican gain.
| nowrap | 

|-
! 
| Joseph W. White
|  | Democratic
| 1882
|  | Incumbent lost re-election.New member elected.Republican gain.
| nowrap | 

|-
! 
| Ephraim R. Eckley
|  | Republican
| 1862
| Incumbent re-elected.
| nowrap | 

|-
! 
| Rufus P. Spalding
|  | Republican
| 1862
| Incumbent re-elected.
| nowrap | 

|-
! 
| James A. Garfield
|  | Republican
| 1862
| Incumbent re-elected.
| nowrap | 

|}

Oregon

Pennsylvania

Rhode Island

South Carolina

Tennessee 

Elections held late, on August 3, 1865.

|-
! 
| rowspan=8 colspan=3 align="center" | None (vacant due to Civil War)
|  rowspan=8 align="center" |New members elected.Unionist gain.
| nowrap | 

|-
! 
| nowrap | 

|-
! 
| nowrap | 

|-
! 
|  nowrap | 

|-
! 
| nowrap | 

|-
! 
|  

|-
! 
| nowrap | 

|-
! 
| nowrap | 

|}

Texas

Utah Territory 
See non-voting delegates, below.

Vermont

Virginia

Washington Territory 
See non-voting delegates, below.

West Virginia 

|-
! 
| Jacob B. Blair
|  | Unconditional Unionist
| 1863
|  | Incumbent retired.New member elected.Unconditional Unionist hold.
| nowrap | 

|-
! 
| William G. Brown Sr.
|  | Unconditional Unionist
| 1863
|  | Incumbent retired.New member elected.Unconditional Unionist hold.
| nowrap | 

|-
! 
| Kellian Whaley
|  | Unconditional Unionist
| 1863
| Incumbent re-elected.
| nowrap | 

|}

Wisconsin 

Wisconsin elected six members of congress on Election Day, November 8, 1864.

|-
! 
| James S. Brown
|  | Democratic
| 1862
|  | Incumbent withdrew from election.New member elected.National Union gain.
| nowrap | 

|-
! 
| Ithamar Sloan
|  | Republican 
| 1862
|  | Incumbent won re-election on National Union ticket.Republican hold.
| nowrap | 

|-
! 
| Amasa Cobb
|  | Republican 
| 1862
|  | Incumbent won re-election on National Union ticket.Republican hold.
| nowrap | 

|-
! 
| Charles A. Eldredge
|  | Democratic
| 1862
| Incumbent re-elected.
| nowrap | 

|-
! 
| Ezra Wheeler
|  | Democratic
| 1862
|  | Incumbent retired.New member elected.National Union gain.
| nowrap | 

|-
! 
| Walter D. McIndoe
|  | Republican 
| 1862 Special
|  | Incumbent won re-election on National Union ticket.Republican hold.
| nowrap | 

|}

Non-voting delegates

38th Congress 

|-
! 
| colspan=3 | New district
|  | New seat.New delegate elected on an unknown date in 1864.Republican gain.
| nowrap | 

|-
! 
| colspan=3 | New district
|  | New seat.New delegate elected.Democratic gain.
| nowrap | 

|}

39th Congress 

|-
! 
| Charles Debrille Poston
|  | Republican
| 1864
|  | Incumbent lost re-election.New member elected September 6, 1865.Republican hold.
| nowrap | 

|-
! 
| Hiram Pitt Bennet
|  | Conservative Republican
| 1861
|  | Incumbent retired.New member elected.Republican gain.
| nowrap | 

|-
! 
| John B. S. Todd
|  | Democratic
| 1862
|  | Incumbent lost re-election.New member elected.Republican gain.
| nowrap | 

|-
! 
| William H. Wallace
|  | Unionist
| 1860 1862 1863
|  | Unknown if incumbent retired or lost.New delegate elected October 10, 1864.Democratic gain.
| nowrap | 

|-
! 
| Samuel McLean
|  | Democratic
| 1864
| Incumbent re-elected to the term starting March 4, 1865.
| nowrap | 

|-
! 
| Samuel Gordon Daily
|  | Republican
| 1860 
|  | Unknown if incumbent retired or lost.New delegate elected on an unknown date.Republican hold.
| nowrap | 

|-
! 

|-
! 

|-
! 

|}

See also 
 1864 United States elections
 1864 United States presidential election
 1864–65 United States Senate elections
 38th United States Congress
 39th United States Congress

Notes

References

Bibliography

External links 
 Office of the Historian (Office of Art & Archives, Office of the Clerk, U.S. House of Representatives)